Naomi Schaefer Riley (born ca. 1977) is an American conservative commentator and author.

Riley's writings have appeared in the Wall Street Journal, The New York Times, The Boston Globe, The Los Angeles Times, The New York Post, and The Washington Post, among others. At The Wall Street Journal, she covered religion, higher education, and philanthropy for the editorial page. Prior to this assignment, she founded the magazine In Character.

Riley was a blogger for the Chronicle of Higher Education until she was fired in 2012 after writing a blog arguing for the elimination of Black Studies at university departments, which resulted in a social media backlash, kicked off by an essay by Tressie McMillan Cottom and a petition demanding her firing, which contained roughly 6,500 names.

Personal life
She graduated from Harvard College in 1998, magna cum laude. She and her  husband (since 2004), Jason Riley, have three children.

Writing
 God on the Quad: How Religious Colleges and the Missionary Generation Are Changing America, Ivan R. Dee (2006); 
 The Faculty Lounges … And Other Reasons Why You Won't Get the College Education You Pay For, Ivan R. Dee (2011); 
 Acculturated: 23 Savvy Writers Find Hidden Virtue in Reality TV, Chic Lit, Video Games, and Other Pillars of Pop Culture (co-editor), Templeton Press (2012);  
 'Til Faith Do Us Part: How Interfaith Marriage is Transforming America, Oxford University Press (2013); 
 Opportunity and Hope: Transforming Children's Lives through Scholarships, Rowman & Littlefield Publishers (2014); 
 Got Religion?: How Churches, Mosques, and Synagogues Can Bring Young People Back, Templeton Press (2014); 
 The New Trail of Tears: How Washington Is Destroying American Indians, Encounter Books (2016);

References

External links
 "Columbia mattress case is not justice, it's shaming without proof", nypost.com, February 8, 2015; accessed March 14, 2015.
 "No, New York Post, feminism is not imploding", slate.com, August 6, 2014; accessed February 24, 2015.
 

Place of birth missing (living people)
Date of birth missing (living people)
1970s births
American bloggers
American editors
American columnists
Harvard University alumni
Living people
The Wall Street Journal people
21st-century American non-fiction writers
American women columnists
American women bloggers
21st-century American women writers